Portrait of Ferdinand Guillemardet is a 1798–99 painting by Francisco Goya, now in the Louvre.

It shows the French ambassador to Spain between 1798 and 1800 and was exhibited at the Real Academia de Bellas Artes de San Fernando in July 1799. Its subject took to France and it was later given to the Louvre (where it now hangs) by Guillemardet's son, a friend of Eugène Delacroix.

See also
List of works by Francisco Goya

References

External links

Guillemardet, Ferdinand
Guillemardet, Ferdinand
Guillemardet, Ferdinand
Paintings in the Louvre by Spanish artists
1798 paintings